The Wadi al-Kheder is a tributary of the Balikh River in Syria.

References

Rivers of Syria